Ángel Manuel Rodríguez (1945—) is a Seventh-day Adventist theologian and was the director of the Biblical Research Institute (BRI) before his retirement. His special research interests include Old Testament, Sanctuary and Atonement, and Old Testament Theology. He has written several books, and authors a monthly column in Adventist World.

Biography 
Rodríguez received a Doctor of Theology (Th.D.) in biblical theology from Andrews University.

He was the president of Antillean College, and the academic vice president of Southwestern Adventist University.

He has worked for the Biblical Research Institute since 1992, serving as director from 2001 until 2011.

Woodrow Whidden has said,
"I have the highest respect for the staff of the BRI and especially consider Angel Rodriguez, the current director, to be the most able defender of the Adventist faith in our time."

See also 

 Seventh-day Adventist Church
 Seventh-day Adventist theology
 Seventh-day Adventist eschatology
 History of the Seventh-day Adventist Church
 28 Fundamental Beliefs
 Questions on Doctrine
 Teachings of Ellen G. White
 Inspiration of Ellen G. White
 Prophecy in the Seventh-day Adventist Church
 Investigative judgment
 Pillars of Adventism
 Second Coming
 Conditional Immortality
 Historicism
 Three Angels' Messages
 Sabbath in seventh-day churches
 Ellen G. White
 Adventist Review
 Adventism
 Seventh-day Adventist Church Pioneers
 Seventh-day Adventist worship
 Ellen G. White Estate
 Biblical Research Institute
 General Conference of Seventh-day Adventists

References

External links 
 Seventh-day Adventist Periodical Index (SDAPI) search for "Rodriguez, Angel Manuel"

Seventh-day Adventist religious workers
Seventh-day Adventist theologians
20th-century Protestant theologians
American theologians
Living people
Andrews University alumni
1945 births